Rashid Juma Mubarak Al-Farsi (born 27 April 1993), commonly known as Rashid Al-Farsi, is an Omani footballer who plays for Al-Oruba SC.

Club career
On 5 July 2014, he agreed a one-year contract extension with Al-Oruba SC.

Club career statistics

International career
Rashid was selected for the national team for the first time in 2011. He made his first appearance for Oman against Myanmar in the 2014 FIFA World Cup qualification. He has made six appearances in the 2014 FIFA World Cup qualification and has represented the national team in the 2010 FIFA World Cup qualification.

Honours

Club
Sultan Qaboos Cup (1): 2010
Omani Super Cup (1): 2011

References

External links

Rashid Al-Farsi at Goal.com

Rashid Al-Farsi - GOALZZ.com
Rashid Al-Farsi - KOOORA.com

1985 births
Living people
Omani footballers
Oman international footballers
Association football defenders
Al-Orouba SC players
Oman Professional League players
People from Sur, Oman